L. Dean James (born 1947) is an American fantasy and horror writer. Her novel Winter Scream, co-authored with Chris Curry, was nominated for the 1991 Bram Stoker Award for Best First Novel.

Bibliography
All works are listed chronologically.

Novels
Sorcerer's Stone (1991, TSR)
Winter Scream (1991, Pocket, coauthored with Chris Curry)
Kingslayer (1992, TSR)
The Book of Stones (1993, TSR,  (UK),  (US))
Summerland (1994, Avon)
Mojave Wells (1994, Avon)
Cowgirls of the Mariposa (as Lana Dean James, 1995, Harpercollins)
Sources:

References

External links

1947 births
20th-century American novelists
American fantasy writers
American horror writers
American women novelists
Living people
Macavity Award winners
Women science fiction and fantasy writers
Women horror writers
20th-century American women writers
21st-century American women